Michael Victor Capobianco (born November 12, 1950) is an American science fiction writer.

Capobianco wrote four novels jointly with William Barton. The books were published during the 1990s. The books address themes such as the Cold War, space travel, and space opera.

Capobianco served as President of Science Fiction and Fantasy Writers of America (SFWA) from 1996–1998 and again from 2007-2008. He received the Service to SFWA Award in 2004.

He was married to the late science fiction author, Ann C. Crispin.

Works

Burster; July 1990.. Young man on colony ship sent back to Earth after mysterious radio silence.
Purlieu; August 2017.. 

By William Barton and Capobianco
 Iris, February 1990 SF novel of colonists’ lives on a wandering gas giant.
 Fellow Traveler, July 1991. SF novel of U.S./Soviet conflict over space travel.
 Alpha Centauri, July 1997. Terrorists plague a colony ship that is mankind’s last hope.
 White Light, October 1998. Two families travel to the heart of the universe and find a Tipleresque heaven.

References

External links
 

20th-century American novelists
Place of birth missing (living people)
American male novelists
American science fiction writers
1950 births
Living people
American male short story writers
20th-century American short story writers
20th-century American male writers